"Golden Rock" is the regional anthem of Sint Eustatius, which was established by the Island Council on July 29, 2004, and was officially ratified on October 8, 2010. The anthem was composed by Pieter A. van den Heuvel.

The lyrics were written to the melody of the Zeeland national anthem, the music of which was written by Jan Morks in 1919.

Lyrics

See also
List of national anthems

References 

Sint Eustatius culture
North American anthems